Five-a-side football is a version of minifootball, in which each team fields five players (four outfield players and a goalkeeper). Other differences from football include a smaller pitch, smaller goals, and a reduced game duration. Matches are played indoors, or outdoors on artificial grass pitches that may be enclosed within a barrier or "cage" to prevent the ball from leaving the playing area and keep the game constantly flowing.

Rules
The penalty area is significantly different from football: it is semi-circular in shape, only the goalkeeper is allowed to touch the ball within it, and they may or may not be allowed out.
Goalkeepers are only allowed to give the ball out to another player through hands. The goalkeeper may only kick the ball to effect a save.
There are no offside rules.
Headers are allowed. There is no protocol of deliberate handball versus accidental handball – the referee needs to make a decision based on the distance from where the ball was hit.
Yellow cards may result in the offending player being sent to the "sin bin" for a predetermined length of time.  Red cards work in the same way as the 11-a-side game, the offending player being dismissed from the match.
Charging/sliding tackles are awarded a yellow card.

Additionally, metal studded boots cannot be worn, as this would damage the playing surface. Players are also required to wear shin guards, but enforcement of this is usually at the discretion of the referee.

Five-a-side is commonly played informally, and the rules are therefore flexible and are sometimes decided immediately before play begins; this is in contrast to futsal, for which official laws are published by FIFA.

The English FA have drawn up a full list of laws for the small-sided game which expands upon the rules outlined above and includes minimum/maximum pitch dimensions as well as technicalities on free-kicks and other parts of the game.

Variations

Futsal

Futsal is a version of indoor five-a-side football developed by the Asociación Mundial de Fútbol de Salón (AMF / English: World Futsal Association). It currently has two governing bodies: the AMF and the association football international body; the Fédération Internationale de Football Association (FIFA).

Indoor soccer

Indoor soccer is an indoor variant played primarily in North America, typically with six-a-side teams on an ice hockey-sized pitch.

Jorkyball  
Jorkyball is a 2vs2 format of football played in a plexiglass cage of 10m x 5m. The players can use the walls to pass and to score. The governing body is the Jorkyball International Federation.

Beach soccer

Beach soccer is a variation on five-a-side football in that it is played on a sandy surface. Rules do not greatly differ from those found in regular five-a-side football.

Six-a-side football

A variation with increased pitch size and number of players on a team.  In this variation there are five outfield players and one goalkeeper on the pitch for each team at any time. Other rules do not differ from those found in five-a-side football.

Seven-a-side football

This is another variation with increased pitch and team size; in this case with six outfield players and a goalkeeper on each side. The rules differ from those from five-a-side.

SUB football is a variation of seven-a-side football primarily played in Australia and New Zealand. The rules have been modified slightly to encourage new players to the game, with strict enforcement of non-contact and two ways to score points: by scoring a goal in the same manner as the other formats, or by scoring a board that is on either side of the goal. The boards are usually 2.5m long and one third of the height of the goal. A goal is 3 points and a board is 1 point. When the ball goes out of play, it may be kicked or thrown in. This applies to the sideline and corners.

Blind football

Different organisations
There are many operators of five-a-side football in Europe (Powerleague, Goals Soccer Center, UrbanSoccer), and most of all in the UK.

World Minifootball Federation (WMF) unites 71 national associations, grouped into federations by continent. European Minifootball Federation consists of 32 member associations. EMF organizes EMF miniEURO and EMF Champions League competitions.

International Socca Federation (ISF) is a 6 a side football organization, running yearly Socca World Cup events since 2018. 40 national teams participated in the 2019 Socca World Cup.

The F5WC is the world's largest amateur five-a-side football tournament in the world with over 48 participating nations.

IFA7 is the international association that promotes seven-a-side football. IFA7 held the first known Seven-a-side Football World Cup in 2017 in Guatemala, with Russia winning the title.

Youth organisations
The popularity of five-a-side youth football has grown tremendously within the U.S. Many organisations have chosen this format and modified it slightly to promote an environment where children can excel early in youth sports. The American Youth Soccer Organization and the United States Youth Soccer Association are among the largest organisations bringing this format to the regional US-based youth soccer arena.

Sponsorships
In recent years a few five-a-side teams have found themselves with sponsorship deals amounting up to thousand of pounds contracts. Sponsors feel with the vast numbers of participation in five-a-side football rising in the UK that it is a good place to advertise and tend to sponsor competition winners or league winners at local facilities so that they know that their deals are with the best five-a-side teams around the area.

See also
Masters football
Street football
Rugby sevens
3v3 Soccer
Tennents' Sixes
Paralympic association football
Jorkyball

References

Association football variants